The Great Western Suburban League was a football league that was primarily held in the Home counties, founded in 1904.

History
The Great Western Suburban League was founded in 1904, drawing its membership from the Home counties to the west of London. The league was generally considered by clubs to be a stepping stone to the Spartan League. After the 1926–27 season, all the member clubs left, with a new constitution of teams being formed for the following season. Following the 1930–31 season, in which only seven teams competed, the league folded.

Champions

Member clubs

1st Coldstream Guards
1st Grenadier Guards
1st Irish Guards
1st Scots Guards
2nd Grenadier Guards
2nd Scots Guards
3rd Coldstream Guards
3rd Grenadier Guards
19th Royal Hussars
Ashford
Berkhamsted Town reserves
Botwell Mission
Botwell Mission reserves
Brentford reserves
Bush Hill Park reserves
Chesham United reserves
Chiswick Generals
Cowley
Ealing Celtic
Feltham Sports
Firestones
Fourstores
Great Western Railway reserves
Hanwell
Hanwell Athletic
Hanwell Guild
Harmondsworth St. Mary's
Harrow & Greenhill
Harrow Weald
Hayesco
Holland Athletic reserves
Hounslow
Hounslow Rangers
Kensington Town
Leavesden Mental Hospital
Leyland Motors
Lyons Club reserves
Maidenhead Norfolkians
Maidenhead United
Marlow
Minters Athletic
Napier
Newbury Town
Paddington
Park Royal reserves
RAF Uxbridge
Reading Amateurs
Reading reserves
Reading United
Roxeth & Harrow Old Boys
Royal Horse Guards
Savoy Hotel
Shepherd's Bush
Slough
Slough Trading Company
Southall
Southall United
Staines
Staines Lagonda
Uxbridge
Uxbridge Town
Uxbridge Town reserves
Uxbridge Unity
Watford Old Boys
Watford Old Boys reserves
W.E.R.S.A.C
Western United
Willesden Town
Windsor & Eton
Windsor & Eton reserves
Wycombe Wanderers
Wycombe Wanderers reserves
Yiewsley
Yiewsley Juniors

References

 
Defunct football leagues in England
Football in Berkshire
Football in Buckinghamshire
Football in Hertfordshire
Football competitions in London
Football in Oxfordshire
Football in Surrey
1904 establishments in England
Sports leagues established in 1904
Sports leagues disestablished in 1931
1931 disestablishments in England